Khovd FC is a Mongolian football club from Khovd currently competing in the Mongolia Premier League.

History
Khovd FC was founded in 2018. Following four seasons in the First League, the club was promoted to the Premier League for the 2021–22 season. Following their first top-flight campaign, it was announced that the club had been sold to B. Bat-Erdene and a new logo was unveiled.

Domestic history
Key

References

Football clubs in Mongolia